Faizpur Sadaat is a small village in the Pakistani province of Punjab in the district of lahore Pakpattan.
This village is mostly inhabited by Zaidi Syed community 

This village was founded by Sir Faiz-ul-Hassan, who was a prominent British civil servant.He originally came and migrated from the city of Wasat which at that time was located in Mesopotamia (present Iraq). Because of his services, the British government gave him a big piece of land also called ESTATE or JAGIR. He settled here and name this village Faizpur Sadat. 

Syed Faiz ul hasssan Al-Husaini -al Wastee migrated from  Goaali Sadaat Nehtaur,UP,India in 1880. He was  Transferred to kasur district for the construction of Head Gganda Sing walla Bridge He was a prominent Engineer.  

Mr Faizul-Hassan was awarded the tile of Khan Bahadur by the British government and was nominated to be knight but died before he could make his way to England for the ceremony. He had had three sons, namely Syed Zahid Hussain, Syed Muwahid Hussain and Syed Mujahid Hussain.

The prominent figures from Faizpur are, Syed Qamar Abbas ex v.Chairman Syed Taeed hassan, Syed Naqi Saqib, Syed kamal hasnain

Also Syed Qamar Abbas Shah established the road and the electricity system first time in the history of Faizpur Sadaat.

FAIZPUR SADAAT

Location
Faizpur village is located 6 km behind Bonga Hayat near Pakpattan.

References

Populated places in Pakpattan District